Alsager Town Football Club is a football club, based in Alsager, Cheshire, England. Affiliated to the Cheshire County Football Association, they also operate a reserve team in the Staffordshire County Senior League and a youth team in the North West Youth Alliance.

History
Established in 1968, the club joined the Mid-Cheshire League in the 1971–72 season. In 1973 they were renamed Alsager Town, a name they retained until 1985 when they became Alsager United. In 1988 the club reverted to its original name. They finished as runners-up in the Mid-Cheshire League in 1987–88, but left the league at the end of the season as they disbanded.

The club reformed in 1989 and joined the Premier Division of the Crewe League. Two years later they moved up to the Mid-Cheshire League in 1991 and were placed in Division Two. After playing in the league for seven seasons, they switched to the Midland Football League in 1998. They finished as runners-up in their first season, earning promotion to Division Two of the North West Counties League.

In 2001 the club were renamed for a fifth time, becoming Alsager Town again. They finished second in Division Two in North West Counties League, earning promotion to Division One. They won the Leek Cup in the same season.

The 2005–06 season saw the club finish third in Division One, resulting in promotion to Division One of the Northern Premier League (NPL). At the end of their first season in the NPL the league added an extra division, resulting in Alsager Town being placed in Division One South. Although they finished fourteenth in the eighteen-club division in 2007–08, the club were relegated back into the renamed Premier Division of the North West Counties League after failing ground grading criteria.

The club remained in the Premier Division until the end of the 2015–16 season when they were relegated to Division One.

League history

Ground
Alsager have played at Wood Park Stadium, originally known as the Town Ground, since 1968. The clubhouse suffered considerable damage by fire in July 2011, resulting in them largely playing away from home until November that year. It currently has a capacity of 3,000, of which 250 is seated and 1,000 covered.

Records
Best FA Cup performance: First qualifying round, 2004–05, 2006–07, 2015–16
Best FA Trophy performance: Second qualifying round, 2006–07
Best FA Vase performance: Third round, 2015–16
Record attendance: 606 vs Whitley Bay, FA Vase second round, 14 November 2009
Record defeat: 12–1 vs Altrincham, Cheshire Senior Cup, 8 February 2011
Record victory: 7–0 vs St. Martins, North West Counties Football League Division One South, 27 November 2021

Honours
Leek Cup
Winners 2001–02

See also

Alsager Town F.C. players

References

External links 
Official website

Football clubs in England
Football clubs in Cheshire
Association football clubs established in 1968
1968 establishments in England
Cheshire Association Football League
Midland Football League (1994)
North West Counties Football League clubs
Northern Premier League clubs